Krzekowo-Bezrzecze is a municipal neighbourhood of the city of Szczecin, Poland situated on the left bank of Oder river, west of the Szczecin Old Town and  Middle Town, in Zachód (West) District. As of January 2011 it had a population of 3,644.

Krzekowo-Bezrzecze comprises Krzekowo and Bezrzecze. The church in Krzekowo is one of the oldest buildings in the city - it dates back to the 13. century.

References 

Krzekowo Bezrzecze